Charles Roy Day (19 January 1905 – 5 January 1991) was an Australian rules footballer who played with North Melbourne and Footscray in the Victorian Football League (VFL).

Notes

External links 

1905 births
1991 deaths
Australian rules footballers from Ballarat
North Melbourne Football Club players
Western Bulldogs players